The Boy Who Could Fly is a 1986 American fantasy drama film written and directed by Nick Castle. It was produced by Lorimar Productions for 20th Century Fox, and released theatrically on August 15, 1986.

The film stars Lucy Deakins as 14-year-old Milly Michaelson, Jay Underwood as Eric Gibb, a boy with autism, Bonnie Bedelia as Milly's mother, Fred Savage as Milly's little brother, Colleen Dewhurst as a teacher, Fred Gwynne as Eric's uncle, Janet MacLachlan, and Mindy Cohn. After the suicide of her terminally ill father, Milly becomes friends with Eric, who lost both of his parents to a plane crash. Together, Eric and Milly find ways to cope with the loss and the pain as they escape to faraway places.

Plot

Fourteen-year-old Amelia "Milly" Michaelson (Deakins) and her family move into a new suburban home shortly after the death of her father. Milly makes friends with her new neighbor Geneva, and Milly and her eight-year-old brother Louis (Savage), a budding military buff, have difficulty adjusting to their new schools, while their mother Charlene (Bedelia) copes with a demotion at work and her inability to learn how to use a computer. Louis is also plagued by bullies down the street who won't let him get around the block. During the first night at the house, Milly is in her bedroom talking to her pet bird. Something flies past the window, but when Milly goes to investigate, she sees nothing.

Milly and Geneva observe Eric Gibb (Underwood), a boy with autism, living next door with his alcoholic uncle Hugo (Gwynne). Eric has never spoken a word in his life, doesn't like to be around people, and exhibits bizarre behavior related to flying. Milly hears that Eric's parents died in a plane crash. Later that night, Milly and her family watch as Eric and three adults appear outside, with Eric in a straitjacket and being restrained by two men. Milly later reveals to Geneva one night when Milly's mother is out for the evening that she finds Eric attractive.

Although Eric cannot communicate with anyone, he begins to react to Milly. Mrs. Sherman observes this interaction and asks Milly to keep an eye on Eric, explaining that because of Uncle Hugo's drinking, Eric is in constant danger of being taken by authorities and placed in a hospital. Milly works with Eric over the course of the school year and takes notes on his progress, which is slow at first. Milly notes excitedly the first time Eric smiles on his own, rather than merely copying her own smile. Eric does nothing when Milly throws balls to him, except for one day when he spontaneously reaches out and catches a stray baseball flying toward Milly's head.

Strange occurrences, like Eric's apparent ability to appear in his own window one instant and in Milly's the next without any link between their homes, begin to make Milly question reality.

On a school field trip, with no one present except Eric, Milly falls off a bridge while trying to pick a rose. Knocked unconscious, she dreams that she wakes up in the hospital, with Eric sitting on the windowsill. After a conversation with him (albeit wordless on Eric's part), she becomes convinced he can fly. Eric gives her the rose she was trying to reach and then, taking her hand, leads her out of the window and the two begin flying. The two watch a fireworks display from a cloud before they share a kiss and return to the hospital window. After watching Eric fly off, Milly's dream becomes a nightmare as she sees her Dad in a hospital bed, dead, with a girl called Mona throwing a volleyball at her which knocks her out of the window.

Milly then wakes up in a hospital and tells her mother that Eric can fly and that he caught her as she fell. A shrink, Dr. Grenader, talks to Milly and tells her that Eric caught her, as she only has a concussion and no serious injuries. Dr. Grenader, however, puts forth a more logical explanation and explains her belief that Eric can fly may be due to stress caused by the death of her father as he died from cancer. It is revealed that Milly's father knew he had cancer, but kept it a secret from his family because he did not want them to worry. Rather than seek treatment, he said goodbye and committed suicide.

Upon returning home, Milly notices the rose on her windowsill and becomes convinced that Eric can fly. When she shouts to Uncle Hugo about Eric's whereabouts, he replies by saying the institute has taken him away as Hugo was found drunk again. Despite the efforts of Milly and her family, they are not allowed to see Eric. As they leave, Eric tries to force the window open and is restrained by two men who try to sedate him. Another attempt by Louis to get around the block fails as the bullies tear his tricycle apart and to make matters worse, his dog Max is hit by a passing car and is taken to an animal hospital.

Later that evening, Milly thinks she spots Eric on his roof during a thunderstorm and after climbing into the attic, she finds Eric, who is soaked from the rain and shivering with cold. As Milly pulls a blanket around him, he pulls out a box and from within it, he takes out a ring which he gives to Milly.

When the authorities arrive at Eric's house the next day, Milly sneaks Eric out, and the police chase them to the roof of the school during a carnival. Eric turns to Milly and speaks her name, the first word he has spoken thus far. Milly asks Eric if he really can fly, and he smiles and nods his head. He holds her hand and the two fall off the building. Just before hitting the ground, Milly and Eric begin flying hand in hand in plain view of the crowd around the carnival, which follows Milly and Eric down the streets of their town, shocking Charlene, Louis, Geneva, and Uncle Hugo. Eric brings Milly to her own window, tells her he loves her, and kisses her before he says goodbye and flies away.

Milly is heartbroken, but quickly realizes why Eric had to leave: Over the following weeks, spectators, policemen, and scientists mob the town, looking for an explanation and taking all of Eric's belongings away to be analyzed. Milly speculates that Eric too would have been taken by scientists had he remained.

Despite all the ensuing media attention, Eric's story becomes an inspiration to the people closest to him in his neighborhood. Eric's uncle beats his drinking problem and gets an excellent job. The Michaelsons' dog Max gets better. Louis dominates the bullies down the street using a water gun full of urine. Charlene masters the computer at work. Milly regains interest in her life and relationships with those around her. The movie ends with Milly looking out the window, waiting for Eric. As the sun sets, she throws out a paper airplane, which flies ever upward.

Cast
 Lucy Deakins as Amelia "Milly" Michaelson
 Jay Underwood as Eric Gibb
 Bonnie Bedelia as Charlene Michaelson
 Fred Savage as Louis Michaelson
 Colleen Dewhurst as Mrs. Carolyn Sherman
 Fred Gwynne as Uncle Hugo Gibb
 Janet MacLachlan as Mrs. D'Gregario
 Mindy Cohn as Geneva Goodman
 Jennifer Michas as Mona
 Michelle Bardeaux as Erin
 Aura Pithart as Colette
 Jason Priestley as Gary
 Cam Bancroft as Joe
 Chris Arnold as Sonny
 Dwight Koss as Milly's Dad
 Louise Fletcher as Dr. Grenader
 Jake as Max the Dog

Reception
On the review aggregator website Rotten Tomatoes, 63% of 30 critics' reviews are positive, with an average rating of 5.9/10. The site's consensus states: "Writer-director Nick Castle's careful command of tone keeps The Boy Who Could Fly from fully surrendering to its story's sentimental tendencies." Roger Ebert of The Chicago Sun-Times gave the film 3 out of 4 stars and wrote ”Here is a sweet and innocent parable about a boy who could fly -- and about a girl who could fly, too.” Variety wrote “The Boy Who Could Fly is a well-intentioned film that deals with mental illness, suicide and other weighty subjects and their effects on children in a general and understanding way.” Adding “Under Nick Castle's careful direction, scenes never become maudlin, which is remarkable considering the potential of the subject matter. Deakins and Underwood handle their difficult roles with amazing grace.”

Box office
The movie debuted at No. 4.

Soundtrack
The film's score was composed and conducted by Bruce Broughton. Varèse Sarabande released a re-recording of highlights in 1986 on LP and cassette (later reissued on compact disc as part of the Varese Encore line), performed by the Sinfonia of London and conducted by the composer; in 2002 Percepto released the film recordings of Broughton's music as a limited edition promotional release. Intrada Records issued the complete score in 2015, including Stephen Bishop's "Walkin' On Air" (written and recorded for the film's end credits in lieu of Broughton's unused end title cue) and the brief song "Back Of The Bus" (written by screenwriter Nick Castle and Broughton).

The band The Coupe de Villes (composed of Nick Castle, horror director/composer/screenwriter/musician John Carpenter and director Tommy Lee Wallace) appear in a cameo on a television in a scene in the film playing their original song Back on the Bus. The band is known today for their theme song "Big Trouble in Little China" for the movie with the same name directed by Carpenter, and their 1985 album Waiting out the Eighties.

1986 Varèse Sarabande album
 Main Title (2:36)
 New Starts (3:51)
 Millie's Science Project (3:09)
 Family (2:57)
 Flying (4:29)
 Eric On The Roof (2:23)
 Eric Agitated/Louis Defeated (3:55)
 Millie And Eric Flee (3:45)
 In The Air (4:31)
 The Boy Who Could Fly (2:45)

2002 Percepto album
 Main Title/Meeting Eric (4:44)
 Military Mission/New Neighbors (2:10)
 Night (1:02)
 Surprise Visit (1:23)
 Eric On The Roof (2:24)
 Milly's Science Project (3:33)
 Heads Up (1:39)
 Family (3:08)
 The Field Trip (1:57)
 The Hospital/Flying (7:37)
 Returning Home (3:59)
 Eric Agitated/Louis Defeated (4:16)
 The Rainstorm/The Ring (6:40)
 Milly & Eric Flee/Into The Air (9:01)
 New Starts (4:14)
 Milly Reflects (2:06)
 The Boy Who Could Fly (3:02)

2015 Intrada album
 Main Title (4:45)
 Louis Meets Hitler (1:00)
 Louis’ Retreat (1:14)
 Late! (First Hint - Revised) (1:04)
 Eric On The Sill (0:28)
 On Milly's Sill (1:24)
 Eric On The Roof (2:25)
 Milly's Science Project (3:34)
 First Triumph (1:40)
 Family (3:09)
 The Rose/Flying (9:35)
 Eric's Gone (4:00)
 Eric Agitated (4:17)
 Louis Gives Up (3:24)
 The Ring (3:22)
 Milly And Eric Flee/He Really Flies (9:01)
 New Starts (4:15)
 Milly Reflects/End Credits (Instrumental) (5:03)
 Walkin’ On Air (End Credits) - Stephen Bishop (3:28)
 First Hint (1:04)
 Fireworks (From To Catch a Thief) - Lyn Murray, cond. Broughton (1:40)
 Back Of The Bus - The Coupe De Villes (0:59)
 Car Radio (2:16)

In popular culture
The band Thrice released a song based on the film, titled "A Song for Milly Michaelson" on their 2007 LP The Alchemy Index Vols. III & IV.

References

External links
 
 
 
 

1986 drama films
1980s coming-of-age drama films
1980s English-language films
1980s fantasy drama films
1980s teen drama films
1980s teen fantasy films
20th Century Fox films
American coming-of-age drama films
American fantasy drama films
American teen drama films
Films about autism
Films directed by Nick Castle
Films scored by Bruce Broughton
Films shot in Vancouver
1980s American films
Films about disability